, or Mount Hakusan (commonly referred to as simply Hakusan), is a dormant stratovolcano in Japan. It is located on the borders of Gifu and Ishikawa, on the island of Honshu. Mount Haku is thought to have first been active 300,000 to 400,000 years ago, with the most recent eruption occurring in 1659. Along with Mount Tate and Mount Fuji, it is one of Japan's .

Outline
Mount Bessan and Mount Sannomine are sometimes included and called "Mount Haku's Five Peaks" (白山五峰 Hakusan go-mine).

Because it is very prominent and clearly visible from the nearby coast, even after the surrounding mountains have lost their snow, Mount Haku still appears white, which is one explanation for the mountain's name, which means "white mountain."

History and culture
Taichō, a mountain Shugendo monk, first climbed Mount Hakusan in 717. For hundreds of years, people have come to Haku for prayers (白山信仰 Hakusan Shinkō). A branch shrine of Shirayama Hime Shrine, which served as the supreme shrine for Kaga Province, is on the mountain. In 1980 an area of 48,000 ha was designated a UNESCO Man and the Biosphere Reserve.

Nature
Mount Haku was designated as a quasi-national park in 1955. It became a national park in 1962 and was renamed Hakusan National Park. Because the central part of the mountain has much precipitous terrain, there are very few roads and, as a result, little human intrusion into the area. Also limiting human intrusion is the designation of the park as a Wildlife Protection Area, covering over 38,061 ha. The park stretches beyond the mountain's borders into Toyama Prefecture.

Geological features
The area surrounding Mount Haku is one of the few in Japan that contains outcroppings from the Jurassic period of the Mesozoic era. Many of Japan's typical examples of dinosaur fossils were found in this area. One of the major rock outcrops is in the Kuwashima area and is known as the "Kuwashima Fossil Wall" (桑島化石壁 Kuwashima Kasekikabe).

Because the mountain is a dormant volcano, it is well known for its many onsen.

Flora
Mount Haku is known for its diverse plant life. Along the Sabō Trail, after passing the Jinnosuke Lodge, alpine plants are found, including the chocolate lily, which is Ishikawa's prefectural plant.

There are many alpine plants which have Hakusan in their name. These include Primula cuneifolia (Hakusan Kozakura), Anemone narcissiflora (Hakusan Ichige), Dactylorhiza (Hakusan Chidori), Geranium yesoemse (Hakusan Fuuro) and Rhododendron brachycarpum (Hakusan Shakunage). These plants can be found on many mountains throughout Japan, but they were first discovered and named along the older hiking trails leading to Hakusan Shrine.

Fauna
The golden eagle, Ishikawa's prefectural bird, lives on the slopes of Mount Haku. The rock ptarmigan, Gifu's prefectural bird, used to live on the slopes as well. During the Meiji period, the entire population of ptarmigan on the mountain disappeared; however, sightings of the grouse have recently been recorded by local residents.

Hiking trails
The three most used hiking trails are the Kankō Trail (観光新道 Kankō Shinmichi), the Sabō Trail (砂防新道 Sabō Shinmichi) and the Hirase Trail (平瀬道 Hirase-dō). Both the Kankō Trail and the Sabō trail originate in the city of Hakusan, Ishikawa Prefecture, but the Hirase Trail starts from the Ōshirakawa Dam (大白川ダム) in Gifu Prefecture.

Because the area is protected as a national park, very few trails have been made on the mountain. Though the trails listed above are easy enough to hike up and down in one day, other trails can take two or three days because of the uncleared trails and rough terrain.

Gallery

See also 

 Hakusan National Park
 Ryōhaku Mountains
 List of volcanoes in Japan
 List of mountains in Japan
 Taichō

References

External links 
 Hakusan - Japan Meteorological Agency 
  - Japan Meteorological Agency
 Hakusan - Geological Survey of Japan
 

Volcanoes of Honshū
Mountains of Gifu Prefecture
Mountains of Ishikawa Prefecture
Mountains of Fukui Prefecture
Two-thousanders of Asia
Biosphere reserves of Japan
Cultural Landscapes of Japan
Volcanoes of Gifu Prefecture
Volcanoes of Ishikawa Prefecture
Volcanoes of Fukui Prefecture
Potentially active volcanoes
Pleistocene stratovolcanoes
Pleistocene Asia
Cenozoic Japan
Sacred mountains
Sacred mountains of Japan
Shugendō
Highest points of Japanese national parks